

Films

LGBT
1969 in LGBT history
1969
1969